Francisco Fabregas may refer to:

Francisco Fábregas Bosch (born 1949), field hockey player
Francisco Fábregas Monegal (born 1977), field hockey player
Cesc Fàbregas (born 1987), Spanish footballer